SS Bingera may refer to a number of steamships;

, a 2,092-ton steamship built in 1905.

See also
MV Bingera (1935), a 954-ton motor vessel, built by W Denny & Bros., Dumbarton in 1935.

Ship names